The 2009–10 Clemson Tigers men's basketball team represented Clemson University in the 2009–10 college basketball season. Their head coach was Oliver Purnell. The team played its home games at Littlejohn Coliseum in Clemson, South Carolina and are members of the Atlantic Coast Conference. All games were produced and broadcast locally by the Clemson Tigers Sports Network. The Tigers finished the season 21–11, 9–7 in ACC play. They lost in the first round of the 2010 ACC men's basketball tournament. They received an at-large bid to the 2010 NCAA Division I men's basketball tournament, earning a 7 seed in the East Region, where they lost to 10-seed Missouri in the first round.

Pre-season 
On Wednesday, May 27, guard Terrence Oglesby announced he would forgo his final two seasons at the school to pursue a professional basketball career. Oglesby appeared in 66 games and scored 777 points in his two seasons at Clemson. Previously, Oglesby played for Norway at the International Basketball Federation (FIBA) FIBA Europe Under-20 Championship. In a press release issued by Clemson University, Oglesby indicated that his time spent playing internationally helped fuel his decision to turn pro.
Oglesby's departure left an open roster spot which was filled by the commitment of shooting guard Noel Johnson, a former USC commitment.

On Tuesday, August 18, ESPN announced that Clemson will serve as one of the host sites for the network's popular basketball series, College GameDay, during the 2009–10 NCAA Division I men's basketball season. Two one-hour shows (11:00 am and 8:00 pm Eastern) will originate from Littlejohn Coliseum on Jan 23, 2010 for the Clemson vs. Duke game. This is Clemson's first appearance on ESPN College GameDay. The series, which is in its sixth season, will make four first-time stops in 2010. Other first-time hosts include Illinois, Kansas State and Washington. The Clemson/Duke game will be one of two ACC tilts featured this season, with the other being North Carolina at Duke on Mar. 6.

On Sunday, October 26, 2008, members of the ACC Media were polled and picked Clemson to finish third in the conference behind North Carolina and Duke.

Regular season 

On December 2, 2009, Illinois came back from a 23-point second-half deficit to upset the No. 18 Tigers, 76–74 at Littlejohn Coliseum. The victory was the biggest comeback win in school history and was also notable as it helped the Big Ten win their first ACC – Big Ten Challenge in eleven tries.

On December 6, 2009, Clemson beat rival South Carolina 72–61, extending their winning streak over the Gamecocks to six games. Carolina leads the overall series, 86–74.

On January 3, 2010, the No. 21 Tigers managed only 12 points in the first half as they lost to No. 7 Duke for the 13th straight time at Cameron Indoor Stadium, 74–53. Clemson had as many fouls as points in the opening period, and their scoring total and shooting percentage (5–30, 17%) were the lowest for a half in Oliver Purnell's seven years as head coach.

On January 13, 2010, the No. 19 Tigers ended a 10-game losing streak to North Carolina by defeating the No. 13 Tar Heels, 83–64 at Littlejohn Arena. It was the second largest margin of victory ever for the Tigers over the Tar Heels. The most being a 20-point 93–73 win in 1976–77, Tree Rollins' senior season. Clemson then followed the win with a 73–70 win at NC State, ending a streak of 13 consecutive losses in the game following a victory over a top 25 team.

On January 23, 2010, ESPN's College GameDay broadcast live from Littlejohn Coliseum for the first time. Afterward, GameDay host Digger Phelps said of the broadcast at Clemson: "It was the best". The crowd was so loud during the broadcast that the production director requested that the crowd keep the noise down when cameras were rolling. The day culminated in a 47–60 loss to Duke, the lowest point total for Duke thus far this season, and the lowest point total of a Clemson team at home since the 2003–04 season, Oliver Purnell's first at Clemson.

Postseason

ACC tournament 
Clemson entered the ACC tournament as the No. 6 seed with a 9–7 record in the ACC regular season. The Tigers lost their opening game to No. 11 seed NC State 59–57, dropping their record in the tournament to 16–57 all-time with 43 of their losses coming in the first round. Clemson remains the only original member of the ACC to have never won the tournament.

NCAA tournament 
Clemson entered the tournament as the No. 7 seed in the East Region, but was knocked out in the opening round by a lower-seeded team for the third straight year, losing 86–78 to No. 10 seed Missouri. The loss dropped Oliver Purnell to 0–6 all-time in NCAA Tournament games as a head coach for three different schools.

Roster

Coaches & staff

Players

2010 commitments

Schedule and results 

|-
!colspan=9| Regular season

|-
!colspan=9| ACC tournament

|-
!colspan=9| 2010 NCAA men's basketball tournament

|-
|colspan=9| Notes: 1 – Denotes Session Attendance

1 – Note that rankings above 25 are not official rankings. They are representations of ranking based on the number of points received in the weekly poll.

Player statistics 
As of Monday, February 15, 2010
|---TOTAL---| |---3-PTS---|               |----REBOUNDS----|
## Player  GP-GS  Min--Avg  FG-FGA  Pct 3FG-FGA  Pct  FT-FTA  Pct  Off Def  Tot  Avg  PF FO  A  TO Blk Stl  Pts  Avg
------------------------------------------------------------------------------------------------------------------------------------
35 Booker, Trevor..... 25-25  753 30.1 150-290  .517  7-26   .269  78-129  .605  63 141  204  8.2  44  0  59  46  37  37  385 15.4
02 Stitt, Demontez.... 23-22  657 28.6  87-199  .437  23-62   .371  52-68   .765  16  47  63  2.7  46  1  77  60  8  31  249 10.8
05 Smith, Tanner...... 25-25  636 25.4  76-178  .427  20-70   .286  66-90   .733  29  79  108  4.3  55  1  57  51  11  32  238  9.5
11 Young, Andre....... 25-3  643 25.7  70-172  .407  43-113  .381  39-50   .780  12  41  53  2.1  40  1  61  45  0  49  222  8.9
15 Potter, David...... 25-23  579 23.2  59-160  .369  36-93   .387  20-27   .741  21  46  67  2.7  61  2  33  41  6  33  174  7.0
45 Grant, Jerai....... 24-22  475 19.8  63-96   .656  0-0    .000  41-68   .603  57  60  117  4.9  66  2  13  30  45  20  167  7.0
31 Booker, Devin...... 25-1  290 11.6  51-83   .614  0-0    .000  22-41   .537  26  49  75  3.0  31  0   8  26  4  11  124  5.0
01 Johnson, Noel...... 25-2  387 15.5  45-127  .354  20-60   .333  8-11   .727  18  28  46  1.8  38  1  23  28  5  12  118  4.7
24 Jennings, Milton... 25-0  279 11.2  32-84   .381  4-27   .148  12-20   .600  29  43  72  2.9  32  0  13  19  7  11  80  3.2
04 Baize, Jonah.......  2-0  3  1.5  2-2  1.000  2-2  1.000  0-0    .000  0   0  0  0.0  0  0  0   0  0   0  6  3.0
21 Narcisse, Bryan.... 20-2  120  6.0  17-30   .567  2-8    .250  4-8    .500  10  10  20  1.0  19  1   5  13  5   3  40  2.0
32 Hill, Donte........ 19-0  104  5.5  10-29   .345  2-10   .200  6-13   .462  6   5  11  0.6  5  0  7   4  1   8  28  1.5
10 Baciu, Catalin..... 11-0  40  3.6  7-15   .467  0-0    .000  1-2    .500  3  14  17  1.5  5  0  2   5  1   3  15  1.4
55 Petrukonis, Karolis  5-0  17  3.4  2-2  1.000  0-0    .000  1-2    .500  0   1  1  0.2  0  0  0   0  0   0  5  1.0
03 Anderson, Zavier...  9-0  17  1.9  2-5    .400  0-0    .000  0-0    .000  1   2  3  0.3  3  0  4   2  0   2  4  0.4
TEAM...............  39  45  84  3.4  0          5  0
------------------------------------------------------------------------------------------------------------------------------------
Total.............. 25  5000  673-1472 .457 159-471  .338 350-529  .662  330 611  941 37.6 445  9 362 375 130 252 1855 74.2
Opponents.......... 25  5000  568-1378 .412 117-408  .287 330-488  .676  295 571  866 34.6 467  - 292 448  74 196 1583 63.3

Awards and honors 
Trevor Booker
 John R. Wooden Award Preseason & Midseason Men's Top 50 Candidate
 Naismith College Player of the Year Preseason Watch List
 ACC Preseason All-Conference Team
 ACC Co-Player of the Week – January 18, 2010

Rankings 

1 – Note that rankings above 25 are not official rankings. They are representations of ranking based on the number of points received in the weekly poll.

References 

Clemson
Clemson Tigers men's basketball seasons
Clemson